Lieutenant Colonel Sir John Reginald Noble Graham, 3rd Baronet,  (17 September 1892 – 6 December 1980) was a British businessman, army officer and a recipient of the Victoria Cross, the highest award for gallantry in the face of the enemy that can be awarded to British and Commonwealth forces. He received the award "for most conspicuous bravery, coolness and resource when in command of a Machine Gun Section" during the Samarra offensive in 1917, during the First World War.

Early life
Graham was born at Calcutta, India, on 17 September 1892, the eldest son of Sir Frederick Graham, 2nd Baronet. He was educated at Eton College and Trinity College, Cambridge.

First World War
Soon after the First World War broke out, Graham joined the British Army and was posted to 9th Battalion, The Argyll and Sutherland Highlanders (Princess Louise's). In 1916 he was seconded to 136 Company, Machine Gun Corps, which was sent to Mesopotamia. During the Samarra offensive, Lieutenant Graham was in command of a machine gun section co-operating with the 56th Punjabi Rifles (Frontier Force) near Istabulat on the evening of 22 April 1917. He was awarded the Victoria Cross for his subsequent actions that night:

After recovering from his severe wounds Captain Graham, as he had become, was ordered back to Mesopotamia where he continued to serve until January 1918, when his company was transferred to Palestine where he was given command of the unit with the rank of major.

After the war, Graham returned to Scotland to a hero's welcome at his home village of Cardross.

Business ventures and later life
Graham later worked in India in branches of the family firm, William Graham and Company, founded by his great-great-grandfather in Glasgow.

In 1920 Graham married Rachel Sprot, daughter of Sir Alexander Sprot, 1st Baronet. They had one son (who inherited the baronetcy as Sir John Graham, 4th Baronet) and one daughter, Lesley, who married Jock Wykeham Strang Steel.

Graham succeeded to the Baronetcy on the death of his father in 1936. During the Second World War, he was given a temporary rank of lieutenant colonel and served in Scottish Command. He was appointed an Officer of the Order of the British Empire in the 1946 New Year Honours, and awarded King Haakon VII's Cross of Liberty in 1949.

From 1959 to 1979 Graham was Usher of the Green Rod to the Order of the Thistle, and participated in many state occasions including the unveiling of a memorial to King George VI in St Giles' Cathedral, Edinburgh in 1962. He died aged 88 in Edinburgh. He was cremated at Mortonhall Crematorium.

Lady Graham died in 1984.

Memorials

Graham's medals are held by the Argyll and Sutherland Highlanders Museum in Stirling Castle on loan from the family.

Reginald Graham's Commemorative Memorial Stone was unveiled at the Cardross War Memorial on 22 April 2017, the 100th anniversary of his gallant action. There is a second Commemorative Memorial Stone to him in the National Memorial Arboretum along with Memorial Stones for all the other VCs who were born abroad.

Honours

References

External links
Location of grave and VC medal (Edinburgh)
Private Papers of Lieutenant Colonel Sir Reginald Graham Bt VC OBE – Imperial War Museum
Graham, Sir (John) Reginald Noble, Burke's peerage, baronetage & knightage, clan chiefs, Scottish feudal barons 107th edition, volume 2, ed. Charles Mosley, Burke's Peerage & Gentry (UK) Limited, 2003
GRAHAM, Sir (John) Reginald (Noble), Who Was Who, A & C Black, 1920–2008; online edn, Oxford University Press, Dec 2007, retrieved 21 Aug 2012]
Lt.-Col. Sir John Reginald Noble Graham, 3rd Bt., V.C. – thepeerage.com

1892 births
1980 deaths
Military personnel from Kolkata
People educated at Eton College
Alumni of Trinity College, Cambridge
Graham, Reginald, 3rd Baronet
Argyll and Sutherland Highlanders officers
British World War I recipients of the Victoria Cross
Officers of the Order of the British Empire
British Army personnel of World War II
British Army personnel of World War I
Machine Gun Corps officers
Recipients of the King Haakon VII Freedom Cross
British Army recipients of the Victoria Cross
Military personnel of British India